The 2023 Copa Colombia, officially the Copa BetPlay Dimayor 2023 for sponsorship reasons, is the 21st edition of the Copa Colombia, the national cup competition for clubs affiliated to DIMAYOR, the governing body of professional club football in Colombia. The tournament is contested by 36 teams and began on 14 February 2023. It is scheduled to end on 2 November 2023, with the champions being entitled to qualify for the 2024 Copa Libertadores.

Millonarios are the defending champions, having won the competition in the most recent edition.

Format
The format for the 2023 Copa Colombia features changes in the entry points of the teams in each phase with respect to previous editions, while keeping its double-legged, single-elimination format. The first stage will be contested by the eight lowest placed teams in the aggregate tables of both the 2022 Primera A and 2022 Primera B tournaments, with the Primera B teams drawn against a Primera A side in eight ties. The first stage winners will face the remaining Primera B teams in the second round of the competition, with the eight winners advancing to the third stage where they will be drawn against each other. The four third stage winners will qualify for the round of 16, where they will be joined by the remaining 12 Primera A teams which will enter the competition at that point. In another departure from previous editions, the order of legs will be drawn for each phase of competition, except for the second stage in which the first stage winners will play the second leg at home.

Schedule 
The schedule of the competition is as follows:

First stage
The first stage was played by eight Categoría Primera A and eight Categoría Primera B clubs, with the latter seeded in the ties according to their placement in the 2022 season aggregate table. The Primera A clubs were drawn into each tie.

|}

First leg

Second leg

Second stage
The second stage is played by the eight first stage winners as well as the top eight teams in the 2022 Primera B aggregate table, which were seeded into this stage according to their placement in the aggregate table. The first stage winners will host the second leg.

|}

First leg

Second leg

Third stage
The third stage will be played by the eight second stage winners.

|}

Final stages
Each round in the final stages will be played under a home-and-away two-legged format. The teams entering the competition at this stage will be the top 12 teams in the aggregate table of the 2022 Primera A season. The order of legs of each tie will be decided by draw. In case of a draw on aggregate score at the end of the second leg, extra time will not be played and the winner will be decided in a penalty shoot-out.

See also
 2023 Categoría Primera A season
 2023 Categoría Primera B season

References

External links 
  

Copa Colombia seasons
C
Colombia